Hamdi Ohri (also Hamdi Bey Qoku Ohri; February 4, 1872 in Ohrid, Ottoman Empire - November 24, 1938 in Tirana, Albanian Kingdom ) was a 19th-century Albanian rilindas and politician. He was one of the delegates of the Albanian Declaration of Independence.
He was as well a delegate at the Albanian Congress of Trieste in 1913.

References

19th-century Albanian people
1872 births
1938 deaths
All-Albanian Congress delegates
People from Ohrid
People from Manastir vilayet
Activists of the Albanian National Awakening